The Hoogovens Wijk aan Zee Steel Chess Tournament 1992 was the 54th edition of the Wijk aan Zee Chess Tournament. It was held in Wijk aan Zee in January 1992 and was jointly won by Valery Salov and Boris Gelfand.

{| class="wikitable" style="text-align: center;"
|+ 54th Hoogovens tournament, group A, 9–26 January 1992, Wijk aan Zee, Netherlands, Category XIV (2593)
! !! Player !! Rating !! 1 !! 2 !! 3 !! 4 !! 5 !! 6 !! 7 !! 8 !! 9 !! 10 !! 11 !! 12 !! 13 !! 14 !! Total !! TPR !! Place
|-
|-style="background:#ccffcc;"
| 1 || align=left| || 2655 ||  || ½ || ½ || ½ || ½ || ½ || 1 || 1 || ½ || ½ || ½ || ½ || 1 || 1 || 8½ || 2698 || 1–2
|-
|-style="background:#ccffcc;"
| 2 || align="left" | || 2665 || ½ ||  || ½ || ½ || ½ || ½ || ½ || 1 || ½ || 1 || ½ || ½ || 1 || 1 || 8½ || 2697 || 1–2
|-
| 3 || align="left" | || 2585 || ½ || ½ ||  || ½ || ½ || ½ || ½ || 1 || ½ || ½ || 1 || ½ || ½ || ½ || 7½ || 2650 || 3–4
|-
| 4 || align="left" | || 2615 || ½ || ½ || ½ ||  || ½ || ½ || ½ || ½ || ½ || ½ || 1 || ½ || ½ || 1 || 7½ || 2648 || 3–4
|-
| 5 || align="left" | || 2635 || ½ || ½ || ½ || ½ ||  || ½ || ½ || ½ || ½ || ½ || ½ || 0 || 1 || ½ || 6½ || 2589 || 5–8
|-
| 6 || align="left" | || 2615 || ½ || ½ || ½ || ½ || ½ ||  || ½ || 0 || ½ || ½ || 0 || 1 || 1 || ½ || 6½ || 2591 || 5–8
|-
| 7 || align="left" | || 2600 || 0 || ½ || ½ || ½ || ½ || ½ ||  || ½ || ½ || ½ || 1 || 1 || 0 || ½ || 6½ || 2592 || 5–8
|-
| 8 || align="left" | || 2620 || 0 || 0 || 0 || ½ || ½ || 1 || ½ ||  || 1 || ½ || 0 || ½ || 1 || 1 || 6½ || 2590 || 5–8
|-
| 9 || align="left" | || 2540 || ½ || ½ || ½ || ½ || ½ || ½ || ½ || 0 ||  || ½ || 1 || 0 || 0 || 1 || 6 || 2568 || 9–11
|-
| 10 || align="left" | || 2600 || ½ || 0 || ½ || ½ || ½ || ½ || ½ || ½ || ½ ||  || ½ || ½ || ½ || ½ || 6 || 2563 || 9–11
|-
| 11 || align="left" | || 2560 || ½ || ½ || 0 || 0 || ½ || 1 || 0 || 1 || 0 || ½ ||  || 1 || ½ || ½ || 6 || 2566 || 9–11
|- 
| 12 || align="left" | || 2615 || ½ || ½ || ½ || ½ || 1 || 0 || 0 || ½ || 1 || ½ || 0 ||  || 0 || ½ || 5½ || 2534 || 12–13
|-
| 13 || align="left" | || 2500 || 0 || 0 || ½ || ½ || 0 || 0 || 1 || 0 || 1 || ½ || ½ || 1 ||  || ½ || 5½ || 2543 || 12–13
|-
| 14 || align="left" | || 2490 || 0 || 0 || ½ || 0 || ½ || ½ || ½ || 0 || 0 || ½ || ½ || ½ || ½ ||  || 4 || 2459 || 14
|}

{| class="wikitable" style="text-align: center;"
|+ 54th Hoogovens tournament, group B, January 1992, Wijk aan Zee, Netherlands, Category X (2489)
! !! Player !! Rating !! 1 !! 2 !! 3 !! 4 !! 5 !! 6 !! 7 !! 8 !! 9 !! 10 !! 11 !! 12 !! Total !! TPR !! Place
|-
| 1 || align=left| || 2535 ||  || ½ || 1 || ½ || 1 || 1 || 1 || 1 || ½ || ½ || 1 || 1 || 9 || 2747 || 1
|-
| 2 || align="left" | || 2570 || ½ ||  || 1 || 1 || 1 || ½ || ½ || ½ || 1 || 1 || ½ || 1 || 8½ || 2692 || 2
|-
| 3 || align="left" | || 2455 || 0 || 0 ||  || 0 || 0 || 1 || ½ || 1 || 1 || 1 || 1 || 1 || 6½ || 2557 || 3
|-
| 4 || align="left" | || 2515 || ½ || 0 || 1 ||  || 1 || 0 || ½ || ½ || 1 || 1 || ½ || 0 || 6 || 2522 || 4–5
|-
| 5 || align="left" | || 2505 || 0 || 0 || 1 || 0 ||  || ½ || 1 || 1 || 0 || 1 || 1 || ½ || 6 || 2523 || 4–5
|-
| 6 || align="left" | || 2425 || 0 || ½ || 0 || 1 || ½ ||  || 0 || 0 || 1 || ½ || 1 || 1 || 5½ || 2495 || 6
|-
| 7 || align="left" | || 2540 || 0 || ½ || ½ || ½ || 0 || 1 ||  || ½ || ½ || 1 || ½ || 0 || 5 || 2448 || 7
|-
| 8 || align="left" | || 2465 || 0 || ½ || 0 || ½ || 0 || 1 || ½ ||  || ½ || 0 || ½ || 1 || 4½ || 2426 || 8–9
|-
| 9 || align="left" | || 2445 || ½ || 0 || 0 || 0 || 1 || 0 || ½ || ½ ||  || 0 || 1 || 1 || 4½ || 2428 || 8–9
|-
| 10 || align="left" | || 2465 || ½ || 0 || 0 || 0 || 0 || ½ || 0 || 1 || 1 ||  || ½ || ½ || 4 || 2389 || 10
|-
| 11 || align="left" | || 2505 || 0 || ½ || 0 || ½ || 0 || 0 || ½ || ½ || 0 || ½ ||  || 1 || 3½ || 2354 || 11
|- 
| 12 || align="left" | || 2440 || 0 || 0 || 0 || 1 || ½ || 0 || 1 || 0 || 0 || ½ || 0 ||  || 3 || 2318 || 12
|}

References

Tata Steel Chess Tournament
1992 in chess
1992 in Dutch sport